Traci Brimhall is a poet and professor in the United States. She teaches creative writing at Kansas State University.

Life
Brimhall was born in Little Falls, Minnesota in 1982. She graduated from Florida State University with a BA, and completed an MFA at Sarah Lawrence College. She received a Ph.D. from Western Michigan University, where she was a King/Chávez/Parks Fellow.

Brimhall is the author of Our Lady of the Ruins (W.W. Norton, 2012) and Rookery (Southern Illinois University Press, 2010). Our Lady of the Ruins won the 2011 Barnard Women Poets Prize, judged by Carolyn Forché. Rookery won the 2009 Crab Orchard Series in Poetry First Book Award, and it was a finalist for the ForeWord Book of the Year Award. Her most recent book of poetry, Saudade, inspired by stories from her Brazilian-born mother, was published by Copper Canyon Press in 2017.

Brimhall's work has been published in The New Yorker, Poetry, New England Review, Ploughshares, Slate, The Believer, Kenyon Review, and The New Republic. Her work has also been featured on Poetry Daily, Verse Daily, Best of the Net, PBS Newshour, and Best American Poetry in 2013 and 2014. She has also worked with illustrator Eryn Cruft on poetry comics that have been published in Guernica, The Poetry Comics, and Nashville Review. The duo published The Wrong Side of Rapture through Ninth Letter in 2013. Brimhall co-authored the chapbook Bright Power, Dark Peace with Brynn Saito (Diode Editions, 2013).

Brimhall received a 2013 National Endowment for the Arts Literature Fellowship in Poetry, and was the 2012 Summer Poet in Residence at the University of Mississippi, and the 2008–2009 Jay C. and Ruth Halls Poetry Fellowship at the Wisconsin Institute for Creative Writing. She has also been supported by the Sewanee Writers' Conference, The Writer's Center of Bethesda, Vermont Studio Center, the Disquiet International Literary Program, and the Arctic Circle Residency.

Works

Our Lady of the Ruins, Norton, 2012, 
Saudade, Copper Canyon Press, 2017, 
Come the Slumberless to the Land of Nod, Copper Canyon Press, 2020,

References

External links

Traci Brimhall website
Interview Poets and Writers
Interview Writer's Digest
Interview The Southern Review

21st-century American poets
Western Michigan University faculty
Florida State University alumni
Sarah Lawrence College alumni
Living people
American women poets
21st-century American women writers
Year of birth missing (living people)
American women academics